Əhmədli is a village and municipality in the Masally District of Azerbaijan. It has a population of 1,372.

References 

Populated places in Masally District